Petros Stamatelopoulos (19 March 1934 – 4 July 2011) was a Greek professional footballer who played as a left back and a later manager.

Club career
Stamatelopoulos started football in December 1952, at the age of 18, when he signed a sport's card at his local club, Panerythraikos. He made his unofficial debut on 3 January 1953 in a friendly match against Panetolikos in Agrinio, where he scored the second goal of the victory of his team by 0–3, even though was playing as a left back. A footballer with great talent, incredible strength and good technique, using both legs, he "held" the informal title of the "strongest wing-out execution" of the era. His contrast to the hard-nosed and unskilled full-backs of his era made him stand out technically on the pitch, evoking the admiration of the fans. In the summer of 1955, he signed a contract with Apollon Athens without the consent of Panerythraikos, resulting in the usual punishment of the time with a two-year ban. After the end of the season he came to an agreement with the management of Panerythraikos and returned to the team, playing with them until 1959. This period constituted the "golden era" of the club, which resulted in promotion for the first time to the second division of Athens. In 1957, Stamatelopoulos was serving in the Greek Navy and competed with the Navy team, winning the Armed Forces championship of that year, while in the same year he was also selected for Athens Mixed team, participating as the captain of the team on 26 May 1957 in the away match and the 0–2 victory against Levadia Mixed team. His performances attracted the interest of Panathinaikos and AEK Athens, while rekindling the old interest of Apollon Athens. In the effort of the three teams to sign him, Panathinaikos, the coach of the Navy team, I. Simos with as an ally and AEK the player's burning desire to play for the club from the birthplace of his Constantinopolitan father. The manager of AEK, Lukas Aurednik, realizing his value and immediately advocated for his transfer and thus Stamatelopoulos signed with the yellow-blacks on 3 August 1959 for 100,000 drachmas and the five players of reserve team to Panerythraikos.

He made his debut with AEK on 2 September 1959 in a 7–0 friendly win against Eleftheroupoli, coming in as a replacement for Thanasis Tsangaris. Stamatelopoulos also competed in a number of international friendlies against Partizan, Flamengo and Santos, as well as in the matches in Cyprus against Apollon Limassol, Anorthosis Famagusta and Omonia in May 1962. On 28 July 1961, in the friendly match against Santos, he played the entire game and amazed with his performance by "locking" the international Brazilian left winger Pepe. In his 4-year spell with AEK, he won a Championship in 1963.

In August 1963, he transferred to Panachaiki, where he played for one season in the second division, finishing first in their respcetive group.

Managerial career
After the end of his career as a football player, Stamatelopoulos was involved in coaching, working in teams of minor categories. In 1970 he took over Lavreotiki, where he stayed for 2 seasons. In 1973 he was on the bench of Athinaikos until 1974. The following year he coached Ymittos for a season and then Afovos for another one. In 1978 he took over Palliniakos for a season and after a brief spell at Platonas in 1980, he Elpidoforos until 1981. In 1983 he managed AO Anixi until 1984 and in 1995 he managed Pallavreotiki, which was the last stop of his career, leaving in 1996.

Personal life
His father, Giorgos, was from Constantinople. Stamatelopoulos had a wife named Marina and two daughters, Margarita and Katerina. On 4 July 2011, he died due to a terminal illness, at the age of 77.

Honours

AEK Athens
Alpha Ethniki: 1962–63

Panachaiki
Beta Ethniki: 1963–64 (Group A)

References

1934 births
2011 deaths
Greek footballers
AEK Athens F.C. players
Panachaiki F.C. players
Footballers from Athens
Association football defenders
Greek football managers
Athinaikos F.C. managers